The Hinglo River (also spelt Hinglow) is a tributary of the Ajay River in the Indian states of Jharkhand and West Bengal.

Course

The Hinglo has its source in Santhal Parganas, runs parallel to the Ajay for some distance and flows into it a little after Bhimgarh, actually near Palashdanga village, Birbhum district.

Irrigation and floods
A dam across the Hinglo provides irrigation in the areas between the Ajay and the Kopai but environmentalists also blame the dam for floods.

However, as a result of improper management of water resources for canal irrigation, the bed of the river has risen and the canals have become derelict. Moreover, the dam is silted up. During the last phase of the monsoon season when excessive rainfall occurs the dam cannot take in all the water and so much of it is released. This surplus water becomes voluminous and overflows the bank of the river and canals. The side embankments are not constructed perfectly everywhere, and the weak points are breached to cause flood. Flood waters can not always find passage to be drained out quickly causing water logging.

See also

List of rivers of India
Rivers of India

References

Rivers of West Bengal
Rivers of Jharkhand
Rivers of India